Arlene A. Becker is a Democratic Party former member of the Montana House of Representatives, representing District 52 from 2002. She earlier served from 1991 through 1992.

References

External links
Montana House of Representatives - Arlene Becker official MT State Legislature website
Project Vote Smart - Representative Arlene Becker (MT) profile
Follow the Money - Arlene Becker
2008 2006 2004 2002 1992 1990 Montana House campaign contributions
1998 Montana Senate campaign contributions

Members of the Montana House of Representatives
1948 births
Living people
Loyola University Chicago alumni
Women state legislators in Montana
People from Rock Falls, Illinois
20th-century American politicians
21st-century American politicians
20th-century American women politicians
21st-century American women politicians
Montana State University alumni
Politicians from Billings, Montana